Dmitri Shostakovich's String Quartet No. 3 in F major, Op. 73, was composed in 1946. It was premiered in Moscow by the Beethoven Quartet, to whom it is dedicated, in December 1946.

Structure
The quartet has five movements:

Playing time is approximately 33 minutes.

For the premiere, most likely so that he would not be accused of "formalism" or "elitism," Shostakovich renamed the movements in the manner of a war story:

A chamber symphony arrangement (Op. 73a) was made of this quartet by Rudolph Barshai.  It calls for flute, oboe, English horn, clarinet, bassoon, harp, and strings. It adds winds for tonal colour in the style of Shostakovich's symphonies.

The first movement is constructed using sonata allegro form. The first theme appears in the first violin and is often heard interacting with the cello. The second theme is stated in the first violin and then imitated and transformed by the other three instruments. The development is rather long and pulls its material mainly from the first theme. Finally the coda arrives with an acceleration and crescendo, borrowing, once again, the main theme as its material.

External links
 
 
 
 
 
 

03
1946 compositions
Compositions in F major